Antonio Prieto Puerto (2 February 1905 - 4 February 1965) was a Spanish actor.

He was born in Aspe, province of Alicante in 1905.

He made his film debut in 1953 in El mensaje, then he appeared in Los Tarantos (1963) along Carmen Amaya, Rififi (1955) along Fernando Fernán-Gómez, El tímido and Llanto por un bandido (1964). His most notable role was Don Benito Rojo in Sergio Leone's film A Fistful of Dollars (1964) along with Gian Maria Volonté.

He won the Premio Nacional de Interpretación de España in 1959 for his work on stage.

He died in Madrid in 1965.

Partial filmography

References

1905 births
1965 deaths
People from Alicante
Spanish male silent film actors
Male Spaghetti Western actors
Spanish male television actors
20th-century Spanish male actors